Muslims make up about 15.6% of Singapore's residents, according to the 2020 census. Islam is the third largest religion in the country, after Buddhism and Christianity. Over 80% of Singaporean Muslims are ethnic Malays, while 13% are Indian. The remaining proportion is composed of local Chinese, Eurasian, and Arab communities, as well as foreign migrants. The majority of Muslims in Singapore are Sunni Muslims who follow the Shafi‘i or the Hanafi schools of thought.

Legal history
Since the introduction of Islam in the region, Islamic bureaucracy formed an integral part of the administrative systems of the Malay Sultanates. In the 1500s, the Sultanate of Melaka was recorded to have applied Sharia law, a practice which was continued by the Johore Sultanate, of which Singapore was a part until 1824.

In 1915, the British colonial authorities established the Mohammedan Advisory Board. The Board was tasked with advising the colonial authorities on matters connected with the Islamic religion and custom.

Singapore became part of Malaysia in 1963 and was then expelled in 1965. The constitution  of the newly independent Republic of Singapore included two provisions relating to the special position of the Malays and their religious rights, Article 152 and  Article 153.

Article 152 states:

(1) It shall be the responsibility of the Government constantly to care for the interests of the racial and religious minorities in Singapore.

(2) The Government shall exercise its functions in such manner as to recognise the special position of the Malays, who are the indigenous people of Singapore, and accordingly it shall be the responsibility of the Government to protect, safeguard, support, foster and promote their political, educational, religious, economic, social and cultural interests and the Malay language.

Because of Article 152, Section 2, the Singapore government discourages missionaries from proselytising the Malay population away from Islam towards other religions. This discouragement is meant to avoid engendering racial and religious tensions with the Muslim population. These tensions would arise because Malayness is closely and strongly identified with Islam.

Article 153 states:

The Legislature shall by law make provision for regulating Muslim religious affairs and for constituting a Council to advise the President in matters relating to the Muslim religion.

In 1966, the Singaporean Parliament passed the Administration of the Muslim Law Act (AMLA). Coming into effect in 1968, the Act defined the powers and jurisdiction of three key Muslim institutions:

 the Islamic Religious Council of Singapore
 the Sharia Court
 the Registry of Muslim Marriages

These institutions are under the purview of the Ministry of Community Development, Youth and Sports (MCYS). The minister responsible for these institutions, however, is the Minister-in-charge of Muslim Affairs.

Key Muslim institutions

Majlis Ugama Islam Singapura (MUIS)

The Majlis Ugama Islam Singapura, also known as the Islamic Religious Council of Singapore, looks after and takes care of the administration and interests of Singapore's Muslim community.

The Majlis is headed by a Council, which comprises the President of MUIS, the Mufti of Singapore and other persons recommended by the Minister-in-Charge of Muslim Affairs. The council is appointed by the President of Singapore.

Since 2009, the council has been headquartered in the Singapore Islamic Hub, located along Braddell Road.

Shariah Court

In 1880, the British colonial authorities introduced the Mahomedan Marriage Ordinance which officially recognised the status of Muslim personal law in Singapore.

In 1958, pursuant to the 1957 Muslim Ordinance, a Syariah Court with jurisdiction to hear and determine disputes pertaining to Muslim marriages and divorce cases was established.

The Court replaced a set of government-licensed but otherwise unsupervised Kadi (Muslim judges) who had previously decided on questions of divorce and inheritance, following either the traditions of particular ethnic groups or their own interpretations of Muslim law.

Today, the Syariah Court continues to exist as a court of competent jurisdiction with power and jurisdiction to hear and determine disputes defined by AMLA.

Registry of Muslim Marriages (ROMM)

The Registry of Muslim Marriages is a government agency that registers marriages between couples that consist of two Muslims. Mixed-religion marriages are registered at the Registry of Marriages.

Previously, the registration of Muslim marriages as well as divorces were conducted under one unit, which is the Syariah Court.

It was first located in a bungalow at Fort Canning and later moved to Canning Rise in 1983.

Appeals on decisions of the Syariah Court and the ROMM are heard and determined by the Appeal Board.

Unlike MUIS, the Syariah Court and ROMM are not statutory boards but constitute a part of MSF (Ministry of Social and Family Development).

Muslim organisations

Ahmadiyya

The Ahmadiyya community was established during the era of the Second Caliphate, shortly before the Second World War. Ghulam Ahsan Ayyaz was the first missionary to the country, who under the directive of the caliph arrived in 1935, in a period when the territory was part of the Straits Settlements. In the 1970s, the community had roughly 200 followers.

Association of Muslim Professionals

The Association of Muslim Professionals is a community self-help group established on October 10, 1991, to improve the socio-economic performance of Singapore's Malay-Muslim community.

Malay-Muslim organisations

Apart from these key Muslim institutions, there are also community self-help groups, voluntary welfare organisations and civic groups like the Young Women Muslim Association of Singapore (YWMA), Association of Muslim Professionals, Yayasan Mendaki, Muslim Missionary Society (Jamiyah), PERDAUS, Singapore Islamic Scholars and Islamic Teachers Association (PERGAS), Muhammadiyah and Islamic Theological Association of Singapore (Pertapis).

Indian-Muslim organisations

There are also many Indian-Muslim organisations in Singapore e.g. Federation of Indian Muslims, Singapore Kadayanallur Muslim League, Koothanallur Association, Singapore Tenkasi Muslim Welfare Society, Thiruvithancode Muslim Union, and United Indian Muslim Association.

Religio-cultural groups

There are also religio-cultural groups like Al Usrah Al Dandaraweyah, formed in the structure of a family.

Others are like the Tariqah group at-Tariqah al-Ahmadiah al-Idrisiah ar-Rasyidiah, and Naqshbandi Haqqani Singapore.

This first established religio-cultural group; of Qadriah, Chistia, Naqshabandiyah, Sanusiyyah, Suharwadiyah; is now named as Khanqah Khairiyyah which was formed in 1971 and they have since been at the same location in Siglap Road Singapore.

Syi'ah organisations

The Syi'ah community consists of Twelver Shi'ites, Ismailis and Dawoodi Bohras.

In Singapore, the history of the Twelver Shi'ites began with the immigration of the Khoja community from India. A member of Khoja community spearheaded the founding of the Jaafari Muslim Association.

During the 1980s, Malays from the Muslim Youth Assembly (Himpunan Belia Islam) joined the Syi'ah community. A centre known as Hussainiyah Azzahra was later established.

The Jaafari Muslim Association and Muslim Youth Assembly cater to the Twelver Shi'ites.

The spiritual leader (Da'ie Almutlaq) of the Dawoodi Bohras is Mohammed Burhanuddin, who represents the twenty-first imam. The Anjuman-E-Burhani caters to the Dawoodi Bohra community in Singapore. Bohra traders started settling in Singapore in the 1820s. The mosque for the Bohra community is the Burhani Mosque which was established in 1829. It has since been rebuilt and is now an 11-storey complex comprising prayer halls, function halls, meeting rooms and offices.

The Ismailis are followers of Aga Khan. The Aga Khan has decided to establish an Ismaili Centre and regional representative office of the Aga Khan Development Network in Singapore.

Hanafi Muslim Community
There is also a significant proportion of the Sunni Hanafi Muslims in Singapore. Generally most Pakistanis, Indian and Myanmar (Burmese) Muslims in Singapore are Hanafi. While they often inter-mix with the Malay who follow the Shafi'i madhab, Indian mosques in Singapore such as Masjid Angullia, Masjid Abdul Gaffor, Masjid Bencoolen and Masjid Moulana Mohamed Ali cater for the needs of the Hanafi Muslim in Singapore.

Da'wah Organisations

Hikmah Times
In Singapore there is a significant impact of the Islamic Dakwah (Invitation/conversion) movement. There are many local/international organisations (e.g., Hikmah Times).

Converts
The Muslim Converts' Association of Singapore (also known as Darul Arqam) provides support for converts.

Mosques

There are 72 mosques in Singapore. With the exception of Masjid Temenggong Daeng Ibrahim (which is administered by the State of Johor), all the mosques in Singapore are administered by MUIS. Twenty-three mosques were built using the Masjid Building and Mendaki Fund (MBMF). Masjid Al-Mawaddah, the twenty-third MBMF mosque, was officially opened in May 2009.
The speakers for broadcasting the Islamic call to prayer was turned inwards to broadcast towards the interior of the mosques as part of a noise abatement campaign in 1974.

Madrasahs

In Singapore, madrasahs are private schools which are overseen by Majlis Ugama Islam Singapura (MUIS, Islamic Religious Council of Singapore). There are six full-time madrasahs in Singapore, catering to students from Primary 1 to Secondary 4 (and junior college equivalent, or "Pre-U", at several schools). Four Madrasahs are coeducational and two are for girls. Students take a range of Islamic Studies subjects in addition to mainstream MOE curriculum subjects and sit for the PSLE and GCE 'O' Levels like their peers. In 2009, MUIS introduced the "Joint Madrasah System" (JMS), a joint collaboration of Madrasah Al-Irsyad Al-Islamiah primary school and secondary schools Madrasah Aljunied Al-Islamiah (offering the ukhrawi, or religious stream) and Madrasah Al-Arabiah Al-Islamiah (offering the academic stream). The JMS aims to introduce the International Baccalaureate (IB) programme into the Madrasah Al-Arabiah Al-Islamiah by 2019. Students attending a madrasah are required to wear the traditional Malay attire, including the songkok for boys and tudung for girls, in contrast to mainstream government schools which ban religious headgear as Singapore is officially a secular state. For students who wish to attend a mainstream school, they may opt to take classes on weekends at the madrasah instead of enrolling full-time.

See also
 Religion in Singapore

References

External links 

 
Singapore